Pine Grove is a community in the Canadian province of Nova Scotia, located  in Colchester County.

References
 Pine Grove on Destination Nova Scotia

Communities in Colchester County
General Service Areas in Nova Scotia